King Harold Business and Enterprise Academy (formerly King Harold School) is a secondary school and specialist business and enterprise college located in Waltham Abbey, Essex. Students attending the school are between the ages of 11 and 16.

School performance and inspection judgements

In 2012, inspection by Ofsted found the school to Require Improvement. As of 2022, the school's most recent inspection judgement was in 2016, when it was found to be Good.

History

The school was founded in 1952 and was named after the last Anglo-Saxon king, Harold Godwinson.

References

External links
King Harold School Website

Academies in Essex
Secondary schools in Essex
Waltham Abbey
Specialist business and enterprise colleges